Air Commodore Francis Ronald Downs Swain,  (31 August 1903 – 28 September 1989), known as Ronald, was a British Royal Air Force pilot who held the World Altitude Record for airplanes from 1936 to 1938.

Early life and career
Swain was born on 31 August 1903 and was the fourth and youngest child of Charles Swain and Rose Downs. He grew up in Portsmouth and joined the RAF in 1922, becoming a member of No. 2 Squadron RAF as a pilot. He was quickly transferred to No. 11 Squadron, subsequently spending time with No. 23 Squadron and No. 6 Squadron as a Flight Commander, commanding the Cairo-Rhodesia Flight in 1933.

World altitude record
In 1935, now with the rank of squadron leader, Swain became a test pilot in the experimental section at the Royal Aircraft Establishment (RAE) where he was involved in high-altitude experiments. Departing from Farnborough, Hampshire at 07:30 on 28 September 1936, Swain achieved a fixed-wing aircraft's world altitude record with a height of 49,967 ft in a modified Bristol Type 138A. During his descent, his pressure suit failed causing him to lose visibility through his visor and find it difficult to breathe. He was forced to cut his visor open with his knife in order to maintain consciousness, eventually landing safely at Netheravon, Wiltshire at 10:30.

Later career
In 1937, Swain left the RAE to command No. 1 Squadron. He then attended the RAF Staff College in 1938, and spent the Second World War and his remaining career in various staff positions. His last appointment was SASO/Deputy Head of the Air Staff, British Joint Services Mission, Washington, D.C., retiring from the RAF in 1954 with the rank of Air Commodore.

Personal life
Swain married American Sarah Mitchell Le Fevre in Portsmouth on 5 November 1938, going on to have three children together. He died in Gainesville, Florida on 28 September 1989.

References

External links
 World Altitude Record (1936) – British Pathé newsreel
 British Pathé interview
 "Ferdie" Swain at the RAF Elsham Wolds website

1903 births
1989 deaths
Royal Air Force officers
English test pilots
English aviators
Recipients of the Air Force Cross (United Kingdom)
Companions of the Order of the Bath
Commanders of the Order of the British Empire
Flight altitude record holders
British aviation record holders
British expatriates in the United States
Military personnel from Portsmouth